Daniel J. Sokatch (born April 15, 1968) is an American activist, serving since 2009 as CEO of the New Israel Fund. In recognition of his leadership and influence, Sokatch has been named multiple times to The Jewish Daily Forward's “Forward 50,” a yearly list of the fifty leading Jewish decision-makers, activists and opinion-shapers who have had a significant impact on the Jewish community.

Early life and education

Sokatch grew up in Cheshire, Connecticut, the son of Anne Stillerman Sokatch and Seymour Sokatch, who was the director of human resources at Yale University.  Sokatch was also influenced by other relatives who encouraged his civic engagement and patriotism. When he was 11, his family moved to Cincinnati, Ohio.

Sokatch received his B.A. from Brandeis University with a focus on history, Near Eastern Studies and Judaic Studies. During his junior year, he lived in Ireland, studying the Irish conflict. After graduation he worked in social services in Boston from 1990 to 1994. In 1994 he enrolled in rabbinical school in Israel, the program at Hebrew Union College-Jewish Institute of Religion (HUC-JIR) in Jerusalem. He graduated from The Fletcher School of Law and Diplomacy at Tufts University with an MA in Law and Diplomacy. He earned his J.D. magna cum laude from Boston College Law School.

Career

He has published works in the Los Angeles Times, The Jewish Daily Forward, The Jewish Journal of Greater Los Angeles, and is included in the anthology Righteous Indignation.

He was a founder of the Progressive Jewish Alliance and served as its first executive director. The PJA sought to appeal to young members of the Jewish community. With Sokatch's leadership, the PJA grew from 250 members at its founding in 1999 to more than 4,000 ten years later. While at PJA, Sokatch served as a Visiting Instructor at the Hebrew Union College-Jewish Institute of Religion in Los Angeles, teaching a class “Social Justice and Spiritual Activism,” and also served on the faculty of Reboot, a national network that connects Jewish Americans from the literary, entertainment, hi-tech, political, social action and academic communities. In 2012 the PJA merged with Jewish Funds for Justice to form Bend the Arc.

From 2008 to 2009 Sokatch was the Executive Director of the Jewish Community Federation of San Francisco, the Peninsula, Marin and Sonoma Counties.

He then joined the New Israel Fund as Chief Executive Officer.

In 2010 The Forward recognized Sokatch for his leadership of the New Israel Fund in the face of "an unprecedented attack against the group" and for "formulating funding guidelines" for NIF grants such that groups "that do not support a two-state solution or the Jewish connection to Israel" are not funded.

References

1968 births
Living people
Jewish American community activists
Brandeis University alumni
Yale University faculty
The Fletcher School at Tufts University alumni
Boston College Law School alumni